Ilya Yevgenyevich Kalashnikov (born 10 July 1982) is a Russian professional football manager and a former player. He works as a fitness coach for Alania Vladikavkaz.

Club career
He made his debut in the Russian Premier League for FC Rostselmash Rostov-on-Don on 28 September 2002 in a game against FC Saturn Ramenskoye. He played in 5 RPL seasons for Rostov.

Honours
 Russian Cup finalist: 2003.

References

1982 births
People from Petrozavodsk
Living people
Russian footballers
Association football midfielders
FC Rostov players
FC SKA Rostov-on-Don players
Russian Premier League players
FC Volgar Astrakhan players
FC Salyut Belgorod players
FC Vityaz Podolsk players
Russian football managers
Sportspeople from the Republic of Karelia